Proterochersidae is an extinct family of stem-turtles belonging to Testudinata.

List of genera
There are two genera:
 Keuperotesta Szczygielski & Sulej, 2016 (junior synonym of Proterochersis?)
 Keuperotesta limendorsa Szczygielski & Sulej, 2016
 Proterochersis Fraas, 1913
 Proterochersis intermedia Fraas, 1913 (synonym of P. robusta?)
 Proterochersis porebensis Szczygielski & Sulej, 2016
 Proterochersis robusta Fraas, 1913

References

Testudinata
Triassic reptiles of Europe
Taxa named by Franz Nopcsa von Felső-Szilvás
Fossil taxa described in 1928